In ancient Greece, medism (medismos) was the imitation of, sympathizing with, collaboration with, or siding with Persians.

The ethnonym "Mede" was often used by the Greeks of the Persians although, strictly speaking, the Medes were a different Iranian people, subject to the Persians.  It was not until the 470s that the Greeks began to refer to "Persians", with Aeschylus' play The Persians in 472 being an early example of this.

Medism was considered a faux pas, even a crime, in many ancient Greek city-states.  However, it does not seem to have been specifically criminalised.  For instance, in Athens suspected Medisers were charged with treason.  The evidence suggests that this was true of other Greek city-states too: in Teos, for instance, a law from the classical period provided that anyone who betrayed the city should be punished by death, but failed to distinguish betrayal to the Persians from betrayal to any other group.

Themistocles the Athenian was ostracized for medism. Pausanias, the Lacedaemonian hegemon of the Hellenic League in the Battle of Plataea, was accused of medism by other member states, an accusation which allowed Athens to seize control of the league. Herodotus mentions the so-called "state medism" of Aegina, Thessaly, Argos, Thebes, and other Boeotians. Astute politicians in Athens often exploited popular feelings against medism as a means to their own advancement, which once led to a feud between the poets Timocreon of Rhodes and Simonides of Ceos in support of and against Themistocles, respectively.

References

Further reading
Medism: Greek collaboration with Achaemenid Persia  by David Frank Graf
Medism in the Sixth and Fifth Centuries B.C. by Helen Harriet Thompson
“The Medism of Thessaly,”  Henry Dickinson Westlake

 
Greco-Persian Wars
Treason